Calvin Anthony Duncan (born March 21, 1961) is an American pastor and retired basketball player. Duncan is pastor at the Faith & Family Church in Richmond, Virginia. He also played basketball with Oak Hill Academy and the Virginia Commonwealth University Rams. He was drafted in the 1985 NBA Draft in the 2nd round with the 30th overall pick by the Chicago Bulls but instead of signing, he joined Athletes in Action, an evangelical Christian traveling team.

Basketball
During the 1980–81 season, Duncan set the all-time record for points in a game for Oak Hill Academy with 61. Brandon Jennings later broke this record, tallying 63 points in a single game. He is a member of the VCU Rams Hall of Fame. With VCU, Duncan was named Sun Belt Conference co-Player of the Year as a sophomore in 1983, sharing the award with fellow sophomore Charlie Bradley of the South Florida.

After the close of his college career, Duncan was drafted by the Cleveland Cavaliers in the second round of the 1985 NBA draft (30th pick overall).  He did not play in the NBA, but did play in the Continental Basketball Association (CBA) for the Cedar Rapids Silver Bullets and Tri-City Chinook.

Personal
Duncan's mother died in childbirth and, with no knowledge of his father, was raised by his aunt in Linden, New Jersey. He transferred to Oak Hill Academy after his junior year at Linden High School, hoping to earn the grades that would be necessary to play Division I basketball.

At Virginia Commonwealth, Duncan earned a degree in criminal justice. He lives in Richmond, Virginia with his wife Barbara and his three children, Richard, Chelsea, and Azell.

References

1961 births
Living people
20th-century African-American sportspeople
21st-century African-American people
African-American basketball players
American men's basketball players
Basketball coaches from New Jersey
Basketball coaches from Virginia
Basketball players from New Jersey
Basketball players from Richmond, Virginia
Cedar Rapids Silver Bullets players
Cleveland Cavaliers draft picks
Continental Basketball Association coaches
Linden High School (New Jersey) alumni
People from Linden, New Jersey
Shooting guards
Sportspeople from Richmond, Virginia
Sportspeople from Union County, New Jersey
Tri-City Chinook players
VCU Rams men's basketball players